Justin Mathieu (born 12 April 1996) is a Dutch professional footballer who plays as a winger for TOP Oss.

Career

Willem II
Born in Goirle, Mathieu began his football career at amateur club SV Triborgh. In 2003, aged 7, he was signed for the Willem II youth academy. Mathieu was part of the Netherlands U16 squad.

In the summer of 2013, Willem II manager Jurgen Streppel selected ten players from the youth academy to be part of the first team in preparation for the new season. At the start of the competition it was announced that, together with two other youth players, Mathieu would be a permanent member of the first team for the rest of the season. On 23 August 2013, at the age of 17, he made his professional debut in a 3–0 home win against Sparta Rotterdam replacing Bruno Andrade in the 89th minute. On 28 August, it was announced that Mathieu had signed his first professional contract. Willem II signed him for three years.

On 14 August 2014, it was announced that Mathieu was sent on loan to Eerste Divisie side FC Oss until the end of the season. There, he played almost all matches that season and contributed to the team winning a "period title". 

Upon his return to Willem II, Mathieu made his debut in the Eredivisie for the club in August 2015. One day before the summer transfer market closed that month, the club sent Mathieu on loan to Go Ahead Eagles for the remainder of the season, who had suffered relegation to the Eerste Divisie in the previous season. As of 1 January 2016, the club from Deventer no longer needed him and he returned to Tilburg.

Cambuur
In July 2017, Mathieu signed a contract until mid-2020 with Cambuur, who had signed him after he had experienced a strong season as part of the FC Oss team in 2016–17, where he had scored 10 goals and made 10 assists. Mathieu experienced a tumultuous time in Cambuur, serving three separate suspensions for the club in one year due to disciplinary issues.

Gorica
In February 2019, he moved to the Croatian club HNK Gorica where he signed a contract until mid-2022. He left the club at the end of May 2020, to be in the Netherlands for the birth of his son during the COVID-19 pandemic.

TOP Oss
In January 2021, Mathieu returned to FC Oss – which had since been renamed TOP Oss – on a six-month amateur deal. It was his third spell with the club.

Honours
Willem II
 Eerste Divisie: 2013–14

References

External links
 

1996 births
Living people
People from Goirle
Association football wingers
Dutch footballers
Willem II (football club) players
TOP Oss players
Go Ahead Eagles players
SC Cambuur players
HNK Gorica players
Eredivisie players
Eerste Divisie players
Croatian Football League players
Dutch expatriate footballers
Expatriate footballers in Croatia
Dutch expatriate sportspeople in Croatia
Footballers from North Brabant